And the Word Was Made Flesh is a 1971 Australian film directed and written by Dusan Marek and starring Jan Cernohous and Jo Van Dalen. The title of the film is a religious quote from John 1:14.

Plot

A wandering scientist out collecting samples comes across a half naked woman being held captive. He rescues the woman but they are pursued by the captor and two strange alien creatures.

Cast
 Jan Cernohous
 Jo Van Dalen
 John Kirk
 Christine Pearce
 David Stocker

References

External links

And the Word was Made Fresh at Oz Movies
And the Word Was Made Flesh at AustLit

1972 films
1970s English-language films